Ragasiya is an Indian actress, runway model, and theater artist.

Career
She started her career as an assistant choreographer to Pony Verma, Longie Fernandes, Raju Khan and later she started doing theaters with Gary Richardson for Mad Horses. She started her modelling career by doing catalogue shoot for "roopam" owned by Viren Shah, walked on ramp for Nisha Jhampwal, Umer Zafer. 
Saran who also rechristened her as Ragasiya. After that she did many promotional item numbers mostly in Tamil films. She has also played supporting roles in films like Indira Vizha  and Velmurugan Borewells.'.

Filmography
Actress

Dancer

References

External links
 

Living people
Indian film actresses
Actresses from Mumbai
Year of birth missing (living people)
Female models from Mumbai
21st-century Indian actresses
Actresses in Tamil cinema
Actresses in Malayalam cinema
Actresses in Kannada cinema
Actresses in Telugu cinema
Actresses in Hindi cinema